Tonasket  is a city in Okanogan County, Washington, United States. The population was 1,032 at the 2010 census.

History
Tonasket was officially incorporated on December 16, 1927. It is named after Chief Tonasket of the Okanogan people, a local leader from this area who assumed the status of grand chief of the American Okanogan after the drawing of the Canada–United States border by the Oregon Treaty of 1846, assuming a leadership role in Okanogan territory formerly held by Chief Nicola who lived north of the border.

Tonasket is a city located along the eastern bank of the Okanogan River in north-central Okanogan County, Washington.  U.S. Highway 97, the main north–south highway through central Washington, bisects the city on its way north to the Canada–US border approximately twenty miles away. Washington State Route 20 turns east of 97 at 6th St, and continues running across the state. The city is bordered on the north by Siwash Creek, on the south by Bonaparte Creek, and on the west by the Okanogan River.

Tonasket, which has been the site of a U.S. post office since 1901, was platted in 1910 and incorporated in 1927. It serves as a hub for agricultural and forestry industries in north central Okanogan County. It is the location of three major fruit storage and processing facilities and the offices of the Tonasket Ranger District of the Colville National Forest.

Many descendants of pioneer families still reside in Tonasket and the surrounding areas and are interested in preserving and sharing the history of their heritage.  A son of one of those pioneer families, Walter H. Brattain, grew up on a cattle ranch near Tonasket, attended Tonasket schools and shared the 1956 Nobel Prize for Physics (with William Shockley and John Bardeen) for the invention of the transistor.

Geography

Climate
Tonasket experiences a dry-summer continental climate (Köppen Dsa).

Demographics

2010 census
As of the census of 2010, there were 1,032 people, 453 households, and 234 families living in the city. The racial makeup of the city was 81.9% White, 0.6% African American, 2.0% Native American, 1.0% Asian, 11.2% from other races, and 3.3% from two or more races. Hispanic or Latino of any race were 16.5% of the population.

There were 453 households, of which 24.3% had children under the age of 18 living with them, 33.6% were married couples living together, 12.4% had a female householder with no husband present, 5.7% had a male householder with no wife present, and 48.3% were non-families. 42.6% of all households were made up of individuals, and 25% had someone living alone who was 65 years of age or older. The average household size was 2.13 and the average family size was 2.90.

The median age in the city was 47.5 years. 19.3% of residents were under the age of 18; 9.8% were between the ages of 18 and 24; 17.7% were from 25 to 44; 27% were from 45 to 64; and 26.3% were 65 years of age or older. The gender makeup of the city was 47.9% male and 52.1% female.

2000 census
As of the census of 2000, there were 994 people, 420 households, and 223 families living in the city. The population density was 1,544.7 people per square mile (599.7/km2). There were 482 housing units at an average density of 749.0 per square mile (290.8/km2). The racial makeup of the city was 88.03% White, 0.40% African American, 1.41% Native American, 0.70% Asian, 0.10% Pacific Islander, 7.75% from other races, and 1.61% from two or more races. Hispanic or Latino of any race were 10.16% of the population.

There were 420 households, out of which 26.9% had children under the age of 18 living with them, 37.6% were married couples living together, 11.4% had a female householder with no husband present, and 46.7% were non-families. 40.2% of all households were made up of individuals, and 21.9% had someone living alone who was 65 years of age or older. The average household size was 2.14 and the average family size was 2.89.

In the city, the population was spread out, with 22.7% under the age of 18, 6.4% from 18 to 24, 20.8% from 25 to 44, 23.0% from 45 to 64, and 27.0% who were 65 years of age or older. The median age was 45 years. For every 100 females, there were 80.4 males. For every 100 females age 18 and over, there were 78.6 males.

The median income for a household in the city was $23,523, and the median income for a family was $28,393. Males had a median income of $28,542 versus $22,250 for females. The per capita income for the city was $13,293. About 22.0% of families and 23.1% of the population were below the poverty line, including 26.7% of those under age 18 and 9.5% of those age 65 or over.

See also
 Okanagan people

References

External links
 Tonasket City homepage

Cities in Okanogan County, Washington
Cities in Washington (state)
Populated places established in 1927
Washington (state) populated places on the Okanogan River
Populated places in the Okanagan Country
Washington placenames of Native American origin